Brigadier General Howard Sanford Searle (October 24, 1891 – September 8, 1972) was responsible for rebuilding the Kansas Army National Guard after World War II and leading the response to two major natural disasters, the Great Flood in Kansas City in 1951 and the tornado that destroyed much of Udall, Kansas in 1955.

Biography
Searle was born in Edgar, Nebraska and raised in Kansas.  He graduated from Topeka High School and Washburn University with an A.B. in 1914 and an L.L.B. in 1916.  During his time at Washburn he was elected sophomore class president, was a member of the Kansas Beta chapter of Phi Delta Theta (ΦΔΘ)  and was initiated into the school's prestigious Sagamore Society.

A year after graduating from Washburn, Searle enlisted in the Kansas Army National Guard and was assigned to Headquarters & Headquarters Battery, 130th Field Artillery Regiment and served overseas in World War I.

He was commissioned a second lieutenant on October 3, 1918.  He served continuously with the Kansas National Guard, and was mobilized in December 1940 for World War II as a lieutenant colonel. He served as personnel officer and then Deputy Chief of Staff for VII Corps commander Major General J. Lawton Collins during World War II.  After the war, Searle became a brigadier general in the Kansas National Guard in October 1946, and was assigned the responsibility of re-establishing the Kansas National Guard across Kansas. He was assigned Assistant Division Commander, 35th Infantry Division.

In the early to mid-1950s General Searle was responsible for managing the response to several natural disasters.  In 1951, he handled the recovery after the Great Flood in Kansas City.  The flood resulted in nearly $7 billion in damage (in 2005 dollars) and the loss of 28 lives.   In 1955, he oversaw recovery efforts in Udall, Kansas after a tornado destroyed much of the town killing 77 and injuring 270.

Awards and honors
General Searle's military decorations included the Legion of Merit, Bronze Star Medal, the French Legion of Honor and the Croix de Guerre with Palm.

In 1951, Washburn honored Searle with its Distinguished Service Award.  In 1962, Searle was named the Topeka Phi Delta Theta Alumni Association's "Phi of the Year." In 1967, he was again honored by Washburn this time with an honorary doctorate of laws degree.  In 1981, the Kansas Army National Guard posthumously inducted him into its Hall of Fame.

References 

1891 births
1972 deaths
Washburn University alumni
Recipients of the Legion of Merit